

Events 
 January–December 
 January – Siege of Pyongyang (1593): A Japanese invasion is defeated in Pyongyang by a combined force of Korean and Ming troops.
 January 18 – Siamese King Naresuan, in combat on elephant back, kills Burmese Crown Prince Mingyi Swa on Monday, Moon 2 Waning day 2, Year of the Dragon, Chulasakarat 954, reckoned as corresponding to January 25, 1593, of the Gregorian calendar, and commemorated as Royal Thai Armed Forces Day.
 January 27 – The Roman Inquisition opens the seven-year trial of scholar Giordano Bruno.
 February 2 – Battle of Piątek: Polish forces led by Janusz Ostrogski are victorious.
 February 12 – Battle of Haengju: Korea defeats Japan.
 March 7 (February 25 Old Style) – The Uppsala Synod discontinues; the Liturgical Struggle between the Swedish Reformation and Counter-Reformation ends in Sweden.
 March 14 – The Pi Day, giving the most digits of Pi when written in mm/dd/yyyy format (this year Flemish mathematician Adriaan van Roomen arrives at 15 decimal places of Pi using the polygon approximation method).
 April 18 – Anglo-Spanish War: Naval Battle of Blaye in the Gironde estuary sees a Spanish victory over the blockading English fleet, allowing the Spanish to relieve the French Catholic garrison of Blaye.
 After April – William Shakespeare's poem Venus and Adonis probably becomes his first published work, printed in London from his own manuscript. In his lifetime it will be his most frequently reprinted work: at least nine times.
 May 5 – "Dutch church libel" bills posted in London threaten Protestant refugees from France and the Netherlands, alluding to Christopher Marlowe's plays.
 May 12 – English dramatist Thomas Kyd is arrested over the "Dutch church libel". "Atheist" literature found in his home is claimed to be Marlowe's.
 May 18 – A warrant for the arrest of Christopher Marlowe is issued. On May 20 he presents himself to the Privy Council.
 May 30 – Christopher Marlowe is stabbed to death in a dispute over a bill at a lodging house in Deptford.
 June 7 – Battle of Salbertrand in Piedmont: Victory of François de Bonne, Duke of Lesdiguières, over the Spanish of Rodrigue Alvarez of Toledo, allies of Charles Emmanuel I, Duke of Savoy.
 June 22 – Battle of Sisak in Croatia: The Habsburgs defeat the Ottoman Empire.
 July 25 – As he promised in January, Henry IV of France abjures Protestantism at the Basilica of Saint-Denis. Legend attributes to him the saying Paris vaut bien une messe ("Paris is well worth a mass").
 July 29 – The Long War breaks out in Hungary between the Habsburgs and the Ottomans.
 October 24–25 – Supposed date of the event described in the 1593 transported soldier legend.

 Date unknown 
 Mihai Viteazul becomes prince of Walachia.
 Robert Bellarmine's Disputationes de Controversiis Christianae Fidei adversus hujus temporis Haereticos ("Controversiae") concludes publication in Ingolstadt.
 Henry Constable's Spirituall Sonnettes are written.
 The parish of Laukaa was founded.
 Khwaja Usman takes shelter in Goyghor Mosque after the Afghan rebellion against the Subahdar of Mughal Bengal, Man Singh I.
 Irish pirate queen Grace O'Malley meets with Queen Elizabeth I of England at Greenwich.
 c. 1593-1604 – According to John Warwick Montgomery, the Rosicrucian manifestos are initially composed by Tobias Hess, in anticipation of the opening of the vault in 1604, according to Simon Studion's apocalyptic timetable.

Births

January–June

 January 1 – Sun Chuanting, Ming Dynasty general (d. 1643)
 January 10 – Prince Maurice of Savoy, Catholic cardinal and Prince of Savoy (d. 1657)
 February 8 – Louis de Nogaret de La Valette, French Catholic Cardinal (d. 1639)
 February 24 – Henry de Vere, 18th Earl of Oxford, English noble (d. 1625)
 March 1 – Franz Wilhelm von Wartenberg, German Catholic cardinal (d. 1661)
 March 13 – Georges de La Tour, French Baroque painter (d. 1652)
 March 20 – Jean de La Haye, French preacher and biblical scholar (d. 1661)
 March 22 – Johann Ulrich Steigleder, German composer (d. 1635)
 March 25 – Jean de Brébeuf, French Jesuit missionary who travelled to Canada in 1625 (d. 1649)
 April – Mumtaz Mahal, Queen of India (d. 1631)
 April 3 – George Herbert, Welsh-born English poet (d. 1633)
 April 4 – Edward Nicholas, English statesman (d. 1669)
 April 12 – Nicholas Martyn, English politician (d. 1653)
 April 13 – Thomas Wentworth, 1st Earl of Strafford, English statesman (d. 1641)
 April 19 – Sir John Hobart, 2nd Baronet, English politician (d. 1647)
 April 27 – Jérôme Lalemant, French Jesuit priest and missionary to Canada (d. 1673)
 May 2
 John Forbes, Scottish theologian (d. 1648)
 Catherine de' Medici, Governor of Siena, Italian princess (d. 1629)
 May 5 – Cesare Monti, Italian cardinal, Archbishop of Milan (d. 1650)
 May 19
 Jacob Jordaens, Flemish painter (d. 1678)
 Claude Vignon, French painter (d. 1670)
 June 3 – Richard Knightley, English politician (d. 1639)
 June 8 – George I Rákóczi, Hungarian prince of Transylvania (d. 1648)
 June 22 – Sir John Gell, 1st Baronet, Parliamentarian politician and military figure in the English Civil War (d. 1671)
 June 23 – Elisabeth of Brunswick-Wolfenbüttel, Duchess of Saxe-Altenburg (d. 1650)
 June 24 – Abraham von Franckenberg, German writer (d. 1652)

July–December

 July 5 – Achille d'Étampes de Valençay, Knight of Malta (d. 1646)
 July 8
 Artemisia Gentileschi, Italian painter (d. 1656)
 Peter Sainthill, English politician (d. 1648)
 July 20 – Henry Ernest, Count of Stolberg, then count of Stolberg-Ilsenburg (d. 1672)
 July 30 – William, Margrave of Baden-Baden (1596–1677) (d. 1677)
 August 9 – Izaak Walton, English writer (d. 1683)
 August 12 – Jonathan Brewster, American settler (d. 1659)
 August 30 – Noël Juchereau, Quebec pioneer (d. 1648)
 September 5 – Orazio Riminaldi, Italian painter (d. 1630)
 September 8 – Toyotomi Hideyori, Japanese nobleman (d. 1615)
 September 20 – Gottfried Scheidt, German composer (d. 1661)
 September 22 – A. Matthäus Merian, Swiss cartographer (d. 1650)
 September 26 – Francis Osborne, English writer (d. 1659)
 October 6 – Jobst Herman, Count of Schaumburg (d. 1635)
 October 9 – Nicolaes Tulp, Dutch anatomist and politician (d. 1674)
 October 13 – Sixtinus Amama, Dutch Reformed theologian and orientalist (d. 1629)
 October 23 – Michael Warton, English politician (d. 1645)
 October 27 – Christoffer Urne, Governor General of Norway (d. 1663)
 November 1 – Abel Servien, French diplomat (d. 1659)
 November 25 – Alain de Solminihac, French bishop and beatified person (d. 1659)
 December 5 – Liborius Wagner, German Roman Catholic priest (d. 1631)
 December 11 – Sir William Airmine, 1st Baronet, English politician (d. 1651)
 December 12
 Adam Christian Agricola, German Evangelical preacher (d. 1645)
 Nathaniel Bacon, English politician (d. 1660)

Date unknown
 Leonardo Agostini, Italian antiquary (d. 1685)
 Louis Barbier, French bishop (d. 1670)
 Francis Russell, 4th Earl of Bedford (d. 1641)
 Claudia Rusca, Italian composer, singer, and organist (d. 1676)
 Mervyn Tuchet, 2nd Earl of Castlehaven (d. 1631)
 Anthony van Diemen, Dutch merchant (d. 1645)
 Jerónimo Lobo, Portuguese Jesuit missionary (d. 1678)
 Mikołaj Ostroróg, Polish nobleman (d. 1651)
 Sir George Radcliffe, English politician (d. 1657)
 Kimura Shigenari, Japanese samurai (d. 1615)
 Giovanni Battista Pacetti, Italian painter (d. 1630)

Deaths 

 January 8 – Mingyi Swa, Burmese crown prince (b. 1558)
 January 11 – Scipione Gonzaga, Italian Catholic cardinal (b. 1542)
 February 6
 Jacques Amyot, French writer (b. 1513)
 Emperor Ōgimachi of Japan (b. 1517)
 March 8 – Paul Luther, German scientist (b. 1533)
 March 23 – Henry Barrowe, English Puritan and separatist (b. 1550)
 April 6 – John Greenwood, English Puritan and separatist (hanged) (b. 1556)
 April 24 – William Harrison, English clergyman (b. 1534)
 May 29 – John Penry, Welsh Protestant (hanged) (b. 1559)
 May 30 – Christopher Marlowe, English poet and playwright (murdered) (b. 1564)
 June 3 – Katarina Bengtsdotter Gylta, Swedish abbess  (b. 1520)
 June 25 – Michele Mercati, Italian physician and botanist (b. 1541)
 July 4 – Min Phalaung, Burmese monarch (b. 1535)
 July 11 – Giuseppe Arcimboldo, Italian painter (b. 1527)
 September 5 – Andreas von Auersperg, Carniolan noble and military commander in the battle of Sisak (b. 1556)
 September 25 – Henry Stanley, 4th Earl of Derby, English nobleman, diplomat and politician (b. 1531)
 October 25 – Gómez Pérez Dasmariñas, Spanish colonial administrator (murdered) (b. 1519)
 November 11 – Albert, Count of Nassau-Weilburg (b. 1537)
 November 20 – Hans Bol, Flemish artist (b. 1534)
 date unknown
 Jeong Cheol, Korean administrator and poet (b. 1536)
 Krzysztof Kosiński, Polish noble (b. 1545)
 Li Shizhen, Chinese physician, pharmacologist, and mineralogist (b. 1518)

References